Manuel S. Enverga University Foundation (MSEUF), also known as Enverga University, is a private, non-sectarian university, which is situated mainly in Lucena, Quezon. It has satellite campuses in Candelaria, Catanauan, Sampaloc, San Antonio, and Calauag which are located in the province of Quezon, Philippines. The university is named after to its founder, Atty. Manuel S. Enverga. Enverga University also has the second highest number of accredited academic college degrees/programs offered in the whole Southern Tagalog Region, behind University of the Philippines Los Banos.

History

Luzonian Colleges
The Manuel S. Enverga University Foundation was built after World War II. The debilitating aftermath of the war brought education to a halt. The economic dislocation that ensued left many young people of school age with little chance of getting an education. Parents from many parts of Quezon Province had to mortgage their lands or sell their last carabao to send their children to college in Manila. The situation presented both a challenge and an opportunity to a group of pioneering and vision-driven individuals led by Dr. Manuel S. Enverga who founded the Luzonian Colleges on January 14, 1947 to give needy students access to higher education.

The Securities and Exchange Commission granted Luzonian Colleges its charter on February 11, 1947. A little more than a month later, the Bureau of Private Schools issued a government permit for the school to open in April 1947.

In the summer of 1947, 102 students, mostly youthful war veterans, enrolled in the two-year Associate in Arts program in the College of Liberal Arts, the first college to be established. The secretarial course opened on May 2, 1947 even as the young college obtained official permission to open the secondary school and the education programs in June 1947. Meanwhile, in 1948 heeding the clamor of the citizens of Sampaloc, Quezon, a high school was put up in that town.

Barely two years after, the College of Law opened to serve the needs of Associate in Arts graduates who wanted to take up law at nighttime. The complete commerce program was given the authority to open on October 5, 1949. The year 1950 saw the opening of a satellite campus in Catanauan, Quezon. The Institute of Graduate Studies and Research and the College of Engineering opened in 1955, giving Luzonian students more varied career choices. The San Antonio, Quezon campus was set up on June 22, 1959. In 1960, the school started to offer technical courses and two years later, the College of Architecture, became a fully independent academic program from the College of Engineering.

The University
The Luzonian Colleges attained full university status on August 8, 1968 with education secretary Onofre D. Corpus signing the university charter. Two years later, on February 12, 1970, the Luzonian University became a foundation, a strategic decision that demonstrated the civic-mindedness of its founders and incorporators who donated their shares of stocks to the University, a move that would eventually prove to be unique but forward looking in the annals of higher education.

Founder-president Dr. Manuel S. Enverga died on June 14, 1981, secure in the knowledge that the university he founded would continue to serve the citizens of Quezon and the rest of Luzon. The Board of Trustees approved the renaming of the Luzonian University Foundation to Manuel S. Enverga University Foundation in 1983 in recognition of the founder-president’s magnanimity.

Meanwhile, the Institute of Physical Education and Sports began to operate in 1979 as an adjunct of the College of Education while the College of Criminology and Law Enforcement, that used to be under the umbrella of the College of Arts and Sciences, became a full-fledged college in 1986. Similarly, the citizens of Candelaria, Quezon gathered written petitions for a satellite campus to open in the area.

Thus, on June 15, 1992 with the required physical plant and laboratory facilities in place, the Candelaria campus started its operations. The Department of Education, Culture and Sports gave full recognition to the secondary education program on December 18, 1992. The full permit for the college programs was released in 1995.

The global need for competent mariners spurred the opening of the Institute of Maritime Studies in 1993. The BS Tourism program was offered in 1997 under the College of Arts and Sciences. Two years later, the program was merged with the Institute of Hotel and Restaurant Management organized in 1995 due to the parallelism and similarity of courses, faculty and laboratory requirements.

Meanwhile, the Environmental Science and Public Administration programs were offered in school year 2000–01 in response to the growing need for professionals in environmental management and preservation and public governance.

The Manuel S. Enverga University Foundation offers various postgraduate programs in the liberal arts, education, physical education, business administration, public administration, and computer studies, and undergraduate programs in the arts and sciences, public administration, accountancy, business administration, law, education, engineering, criminology and law enforcement, architecture and fine arts, computer studies, maritime education and also technical courses.

The various colleges and institutes have qualified, dedicated and competent faculty members and academic administrators who make education in the University excellence – driven, relevant, and adaptable to contemporary global needs.

On March 11, 2009, the Commission on Higher Education granted autonomous status to the university. At that time, the university shortened and applied the name "Enverga University".

Board of trustees

Executive committee

College departments

Notable alumni

Proceso Alcala, 12th Secretary of the Department of Agriculture
Orlan Calayag, administrator of the National Food Authority
Jenny Miller, Filipina actress, GMA Network
Mau Marcelo, first winner of Philippine Idol (2006)
Ahtisa Manalo, Binibining Pilipinas International 2018
Ysmael Baysa, current CFO of Jollibee corporation

World linkages

Osaka, Japan
Abu Dhabi, Dubai, United Arab Emirates
Singapore
Hanoi, Vietnam

References

Universities and colleges in Lucena, Philippines